Koothali  is a village in Kozhikode district in the state of Kerala, India.

The name Koothali has been evolved from two terms Kooth+Ali in which "Kooth" means  performing arts like "Kathakali", "Koodiyattam" etc. and  "Ali" means the venue where such art forms are performed. In ancient times Koothali was a place where this kind of performing arts were taught and practiced  by artists of "Koothali-Thambayi"- the then ruler of Koothali. Koothali has around six hundreds of years of long history and it goes back to the time of Tippu Sultan and beyond.

Transportation
Koothali village connects to other parts of India through Perambra town.  The nearest airports are at Kannur and Kozhikode.  The nearest railway station is at Koyiandy.  The national highway no.66 passes through Koyilandy and the northern stretch connects to Mangalore, Goa and Mumbai.  The southern stretch connects to Cochin and Trivandrum.  The eastern National Highway No.54 going through Perambra Kuttiady connects to Mananthavady, Mysore and Bangalore.

References

Perambra
Koyilandy area